The 2001 African U-17 Championship was a football competition organized by the Confederation of African Football (CAF). The tournament took place in Seychelles. The top three teams qualified for the 2001 FIFA U-17 World Championship.

Guinea, who were originally one of the finalists, were disqualified from the tournament on the morning of the final due to government interference in the Guinean federation, forcing the final to be postponed by one day. Guinea was replaced by Burkina Faso.

Qualification

Qualified teams

 

 (host nation)

Group stage

Group A

{| cellpadding="0" cellspacing="0" width="100%"
|-
|width="60%"|

Group B

{| cellpadding="0" cellspacing="0" width="100%"
|-
|width="60%"|

Knock-out stage

Semi-finals

Third place match

The final was rearranged for March 3, with Burkina Faso, who originally lost the semifinal against Guinea, declared as finalists.

Final

Winners

Countries to participate in 2001 FIFA U-17 World Championship
The 3 teams which qualified for 2001 FIFA U-17 World Championship.

References

External links
RSSSF.com
Confederation of African Football

Africa U-17 Cup of Nations
under
2001 in youth association football